{{DISPLAYTITLE:C6H14O12P2}}
The molecular formula C6H14O12P2 (molar mass: 340.12 g/mol) may refer to:

 Fructose 1,6-bisphosphate
 Fructose 2,6-bisphosphate
 Glucose 1,6-bisphosphate